Kaff al-Jaa (pronounced Kāf al Jā`; also spelled Kaf al-Jaz and Caaf Aljaa) is a village in northwestern Syria, administratively part of the Tartus Governorate. Nearby localities include al-Qadmus to the west, Deir Mama to the northeast, Masyaf to the east, Wadi al-Oyun to the south and Hammam Wasel to the southwest. According to the Syria Central Bureau of Statistics, Kaff al-Jaa had a population of 2,068 in the 2004 census. Its inhabitants are predominantly Alawites.

The area is surrounded by mountains. The highest mountain of Kaff al-Jaa is the Alcaadboon, with a height of 1,194 meters.

References

Populated places in Baniyas District
Alawite communities in Syria